Holophysis is a genus of moths in the family Gelechiidae.

Species
 Holophysis anoma Walsingham, 1910
 Holophysis autodesma (Meyrick, 1918)
 Holophysis auxiliaris (Meyrick, 1918)
 Holophysis barydesma (Meyrick, 1918)
 Holophysis emblemella (Clemens, 1860)
 Holophysis quadrimaculata Walsingham, 1910
 Holophysis stagmatophoria Walsingham, 1910
 Holophysis tentatella (Walker, 1864)
 Holophysis xanthostoma Walsingham, 1910

References

 
Anacampsini